Bang Len is one of the six subdistricts (tambon) of Bang Yai District, in Nonthaburi Province, Thailand. The subdistrict is bounded by (clockwise from north) Bang Rak Yai, Bang Rak Noi, Bang Krang, Bang Khu Wiang, Bang Muang and Sao Thong Hin subdistricts. In 2020 it had a total population of 19,566 people.

Administration

Central administration
The subdistrict is subdivided into 11 administrative villages (muban).

Local administration
The area of the subdistrict is shared by two local administrative organizations.
Bang Len Subdistrict Municipality
Bang Muang Subdistrict Municipality

References

External links
Website of Bang Len Subdistrict Municipality
Website of Bang Muang Subdistrict Municipality

Tambon of Nonthaburi province
Populated places in Nonthaburi province